The Barton Cougars are the sports teams of Barton Community College located in Great Bend, Kansas, United States. They participate in the National Junior College Athletic Association (NJCAA) and in the Kansas Jayhawk Community College Conference.

Sports

Men's sports
Baseball
Basketball
Bowling
Cross country
Golf
Soccer
Swimming
Tennis
Track & field
Wrestling

Women's sports
Basketball
Bowling
Cross country
Golf
Soccer
Softball
Swimming
Tennis
Track & field
Volleyball

Facilities
Barton Community College has five athletics facilities.
 Lawson-Biggs Field – home of the Cougars baseball team
 L.T. & Sheila Fleske Court in Kirkman Activity Center – home of the Cougars men's and women's basketball teams, and volleyball team
 Tennis Courts – home of the Cougars tennis teams
 Cougar Field – home of the Lady Cougars softball team
 Cougar Soccer & Track Complex – home of the Cougars soccer and track & field teams

References

External links
 

 
Sports teams in Kansas